Ukraine has participated in all Summer and Winter Universiades since the dissolution of the Soviet Union in 1991.

Medal count

Medals at the Summer Universiade

Medals at the Winter Universiade

Medals by summer sport

Medals by winter sport

Most successful Ukrainian competitors

Summer Univesiades 
215 Ukrainian athletes won at least two medals at Winter Universiades. Among athletes who won more than 6 medals are also Olena Dmytrash (rhythmic gymnastics, 9 medals), Hanna Rizatdinova (rhythmic gymnastics, 8 medals), Ihor Radivilov (artistic gymnastics, 7 medals), Serhiy Breus, Vyacheslav Shyrshov, Serhiy Frolov (all — swimming, 6 medals), Natalia Hodunko, Oleksandra Hridasova, and Yevheniia Homon (all — rhythmic gymnastics, 6 medals).

Winter Univesiades 
41 Ukrainian athletes won at least two medals at Winter Universiades. Among athletes who won more than 4 medals are also Iana Bondar (biathlon, 6 medals), Roman Pryma (biathlon, 5 medals), Valentyna Semerenko, Oleksiy Korobeinikov, Serhiy Sednev (all — biathlon, 4 medals), and Mykola Popovych (cross-country skiing, 4 medals).

See also 
 Ukraine at the Olympics
 Ukraine at the Paralympics
 Ukraine at the European Games
 Ukraine at the Youth Olympics
 Ukraine at the European Youth Olympic Festival
 Ukraine at the World Games

External links 
 FISU History at the FISU
 Україна у міжнародному спортивному студентському русі

 
Nations at the Universiade
Sport in Ukraine